Horace Gould (born Horace Harry Twigg 20 September 1921 – 4 November 1968) was a British racing driver from Bristol.

Career
Known for his portly frame and larger-than-life character, Gould began racing sports cars in 1952 at the wheel of a Cooper-MG. He moved into Formula One in 1954, competing as a privateer and using the team name Gould's Garage (Bristol).

He participated in 17 Formula One World Championship Grands Prix, debuting on 17 July 1954, plus numerous non-Championship races. He scored a total of 2 championship points, thanks to driving his Maserati 250F to fifth place in the 1956 British Grand Prix, enough to earn him joint 19th place in that season's World Championship. He won minor non-championship Formula One races at Castle Combe in 1954 and Aintree in 1956, and also won two points in the 1957 World Sportscar Championship, finishing in 5th place in that season's 1000km of Nürburgring, sharing a Maserati 300S with teammates Stirling Moss, Juan Manuel Fangio and Chico Godia.

Although most of Gould's career was spent in England, he also had spells living and racing in New Zealand and Modena, Italy, home of the Maserati factory.

The similarity of Gould's build and driving style to those of José Froilán González led to him being dubbed "the Gonzalez of the West Country".

Gould died suddenly, in Southmead, England, of a heart attack, at the age of 47. His sons Martin, Stephen and Richard still live in Bristol. Martin went into motor racing and raced in Formula 3, and two of his grandchildren Daniel Gould and James Gould also had careers at a young age in motorsport.

Complete Formula One World Championship Results
(key)

References

English racing drivers
English Formula One drivers
Maserati Formula One drivers
1921 births
1968 deaths
Sportspeople from Bristol